Kazakhstanskaya Pravda is a Kazakhstani newspaper that is government-backed. The paper was first published on 1 February 1920. The paper was started by the ministry of information and public accord. It is published in the Russian language.

See also
Media of Kazakhstan

References

External links 
Kazakhstanskaya Pravda
Kazakhstanskaya Pravda Official Site

Newspapers established in 1920
Russian-language newspapers published in Kazakhstan
State media
Communist newspapers